Robin de Jesús is an American film and theater actor of Puerto Rican descent. He has received Tony Award nominations for his roles in In the Heights, La Cage aux Folles, and The Boys in the Band.

Life and career
Robin de Jesús was born in Norwalk, Connecticut.

His first major role was as Michael in the independent film Camp (2003), where he plays a gay teen who gets beat up for wearing drag to his prom. While the film (which also starred a young Anna Kendrick) went relatively unnoticed in the mainstream, it gained a cult following among musical theater fans and teens who connected to the outcast theme.

He is perhaps best known for playing the role of Sonny in the 2008 Broadway musical In the Heights, for which he received a Tony Award nomination for Best Featured Actor in a Musical. In 2010, he joined the revival cast of La Cage aux Folles as Jacob, the sassy housekeeper, which earned him his second Tony Award nomination in the Featured Actor category. The production opened at the Longacre Theatre on April 18, 2010. De Jesús left the production on February 13, 2011, replaced by Wilson Jermaine Heredia. De Jesús played the role of Boq in the Broadway production of Wicked at the Gershwin Theatre. In 2019, he received a third Tony Award nomination, for Best Featured Actor in a Play, for his role of Emory in The Boys in the Band. He recreated the role for the 2020 film adaptation produced for Netflix.

In 2021, Jesús played Michael in the musical drama tick, tick... BOOM!, the directorial debut of Lin-Manuel Miranda, for which he received critical acclaim and a nomination for the Satellite Award for Best Supporting Actor – Motion Picture.

Personal life 
Robin is gay

Credits

Film

Television

Theater

Awards and nominations

See also
 LGBT culture in New York City
 List of LGBT people from New York City

References

External links

 Robin de Jesús at the BroadwayWorld International Database
 Robin de Jesús on Myspace

Living people
Actors from Norwalk, Connecticut
American male film actors
American male musical theatre actors
American male stage actors
Male actors from Connecticut
LGBT people from Connecticut
American gay actors
American people of Puerto Rican descent
LGBT Hispanic and Latino American people
Year of birth missing (living people)